Clutha-Southland was a parliamentary constituency returning one member to the New Zealand House of Representatives. The last MP for Clutha Southland was Hamish Walker of the National Party. He held the seat for one term, being elected at the 2017 general election and representing the electorate until the 2020 general election where he retired from Parliament, and the seat was replaced with the Southland electorate.

Population centres
Clutha-Southland was promulgated as one of the original 65 MMP electorates, centred on Southland district and covering an area stretching from Fiordland across the far south of the South Island to the south Otago coast. Its largest population centres were Gore and Balclutha. In 2008, the seat of Otago was abolished and split between the Waitaki and Clutha-Southland electorates, and parts of Central Otago, primarily around Arrowtown, Queenstown and Roxburgh were also transferred to Clutha-Southland.

Clutha-Southland was the successor to the old Wallace, Clutha and Awarua constituencies. Its boundaries had changed at all three redistributions undertaken since its creation, as dwindling populations in both the old Clutha-Southland electorate and in the neighbouring Invercargill electorate have forced both seats northwards to ensure every electorate population stays within certain limits. It was renamed  as it no longer included the Clutha area.

History
Because of its largely rural nature, Clutha-Southland was one of the National Party's safest seats. Bill English, who is the former Prime Minister, held the seat from 1996 to 2014. English announced in January 2014 that he would retire as the electorate MP at the 2014 general election, becoming a list MP only.

Barclay became at that time the youngest MP in the House of Representatives. In 2017, he announced he would not stand for re-election at the 2017 election, after revealing he had secretly recorded staff in his office without their consent. The seat was won at the election by Hamish Walker, retaining it for the National Party. Similarly, in 2020, Walker admitted leaking sensitive private patient details about COVID-19 patients, and subsequently announced that he would not stand for re-election during the 2020 New Zealand general election.

In April 2020, the Electoral Commission announced that Clutha-Southland would have its borders substantially changed and that it would be renamed to the Southland electorate. As part of the changes, the Alexandra and the Clyde area would be transferred from Waitaki to Southland while South Otago was transferred to the newly-created Taieri electorate. The Invercargill electorate also expanded into western Southland.

Members of Parliament for Clutha-Southland
The electorate has been represented by three members of parliament so far.

Key

List MPs
Members of Parliament elected from party lists in elections where that person also unsuccessfully contested the electorate. Unless otherwise stated, all MPs terms began and ended at general elections.

Election results

2017 election

2014 election

2011 election

Electorate (as at 26 November 2011): 43,395

2008 election

2005 election

2002 election 
*Percentage change calculation based on percent as Alliance candidate in 1999 election.

1999 election

1996 election

Table footnotes

References 

Historical electorates of New Zealand
Politics of Southland, New Zealand
1996 establishments in New Zealand